Vincent Bennett is an American musician, best known as the vocalist and only remaining original member of the American deathcore band The Acacia Strain. He is also the vocalist for the hardcore band Cockpunch.

Bennett is straight edge. He has a dog named Coco.

Discography

The Acacia Strain

As guest member

References

Living people
1982 births
21st-century American singers
American heavy metal singers
The Acacia Strain members